Zazul may refer to:

One of mad scientists of Stanisław Lem
A populated place in Kaseliyan Rural District, Iran